Peter David Lebling (born October 30, 1949) is an American interactive fiction game designer (implementor) and programmer who has worked at various companies, including Infocom and Avid.

Life and career
He was born in Washington, D.C., grew up in Maryland, and attended MIT, where he obtained a degree in political science before becoming a member of its Laboratory for Computer Science.

After encountering the original Adventure game (also called Colossal Cave), he was fascinated by the concept and—together with Marc Blank, Tim Anderson and Bruce Daniels—set out to write an adventure game with a better parser, which became Zork. In 1979, he became one of the founders of Infocom.

His games include Zork I, II and III, Starcross, Suspect, Spellbreaker, The Lurking Horror and James Clavell's Shogun.

After Infocom's end in 1989, Lebling worked on a GUI spreadsheet program, joined Avid (a company doing special effects for broadcast and film), and designed server applications at Ucentric.

Lebling currently resides in Concord, Massachusetts with his wife. He is a programmer for British defense contractor BAE Systems.

References

External links

Interview with Dave Lebling at Adventure Classic Gaming (2001)

1949 births
Academy of Interactive Arts & Sciences Pioneer Award recipients
American video game designers
American video game programmers
Infocom
Interactive fiction writers
Living people
MIT School of Humanities, Arts, and Social Sciences alumni
People from Maryland
People from Washington, D.C.